Daniel Ljungman (born 3 April 2002) is a Swedish professional ice hockey right wing for Rögle BK of the Swedish Hockey League (SHL).

Playing career
Ljungman made his professional debut during the 2020–21 season where he recorded two goals and two assists in 42 games for Linköping HC. He was drafted in the fifth round, 154th overall, by the Dallas Stars in the 2020 NHL Entry Draft.

Ahead of the 2022–23 SHL season, Ljungman signed a two-year contract with Rögle BK.

International play

Ljungman represented Sweden at the 2022 World Junior Ice Hockey Championships and won a bronze medal.

Career statistics

Regular season and playoffs

International

References

External links
 

2002 births
Living people
Dallas Stars draft picks
Linköping HC players
Södertälje SK players
Rögle BK players
Sportspeople from Uppsala
Swedish ice hockey players